The Methuen Rail Trail is a rail trail in Methuen and Lawrence, Massachusetts, in the United States. The abandoned rail path continues in both directions; south of Manchester Street, the path is abandoned and walkable, although with no indication of it being a trail, while to the north, the trail continues as the Salem Rail Trail in Salem, New Hampshire.

Along the trail, there are marshes, fences, houses, and a few businesses on the adjacent streets. Birds of various types, squirrels, chipmunks, rabbits, turtles, beavers, and otters can be found on or next to the trail.

Route 
From south to north, the trail officially starts at Manchester Street in Lawrence. The trail quickly enters Methuen. Near the city border, the trail connects to the Spicket River Greenway, a trail running from west to east through Lawrence. The Methuen Rail Trail parallels Railroad Street in Methuen, passing under Oakland Avenue and having an at-grade intersection with Union Street. Here there is a building that used to be a railroad station for the Manchester and Lawrence Railroad. The trail then reaches a parking area along Railroad Street. At about the halfway point, the trail passes under Osgood Street and Lowell Street (Route 113). The trail then crosses the Spicket River, a tributary of the Merrimack River vital to Methuen's development. Continuing north, the trail crosses under Route 213 and reaches a back entrance of the MSPCA. The Methuen Rail Trail ends at the New Hampshire state border, but the physical trail continues north into Salem, Windham, and Derry.

References 

Methuen, Massachusetts
Rail trails in Massachusetts